The 2018 Asdira funeral bombing took place on 12 April 2018, in the village of Asdira, located in the Al-Shirqat District of Saladin Governorate in Iraq. The bombing killed 25 people and wounded 18 others. The attack took place at a funeral for Iraqi fighters who had been killed by ISIS.

See also
 2016 Sana'a funeral airstrike

References

2018 murders in Iraq
Saladin Governorate
Mass murder in 2018